The E4 Expressway or Faisalabad–Khanewal Expressway is a proposed controlled-access expressway which will link Faisalabad with Khanewal in Punjab, Pakistan.

See also
 Expressways of Pakistan
 E75 Murree Expressway
 E35 Hazara Expressway

References

External links
 National Highway Authority
 Pakistan National Highways & Motorway Police

4
4